Filino is a rural locality (a village) in Tolshmenskoye Rural Settlement, Totemsky District, Vologda Oblast, Russia. The population was 4 as of 2002.

Geography 
Filino is located 86 km southwest of Totma (the district's administrative centre) by road. Shulgino is the nearest rural locality.

References 

Rural localities in Totemsky District